The Battle of Hanging Rock (August 6, 1780) was a battle in the American Revolutionary War that occurred between the American Patriots and the British. It was part of a campaign by militia General Thomas Sumter to harass or destroy British outposts in the South Carolina back-country that had been established after the fall of Charleston in May 1780.

Future President Andrew Jackson (aged 13) and his brother Robert partook in the battle.

Background  

Throughout 1779 and early 1780, the British "southern strategy" to regain control of its rebellious provinces in the American Revolutionary War went well, with successful amphibious operations against Savannah, Georgia and Charleston, South Carolina, and a routing of the few remaining Continental Army troops in South Carolina in the May 29, 1780 Battle of Waxhaws. The British, in complete control of both South Carolina and Georgia, established outposts in the interior of both states to recruit Loyalists and to suppress Patriot dissent.

One of these outposts was established at Hanging Rock, in present-day Lancaster County south of Heath Springs. The most northerly of the British posts, it was well fortified with more than 1,400 British troops, including the 500 man Prince of Wales American Volunteer Regiment, a Loyalist unit of the British Army, local Loyalist militia, and some dragoons from the British Legion. These forces were under the overall command of Major John Carden.

The Americans were under Brigadier General Thomas Sumter, commanding troops made up of Major Richard Winn's Fairfield regiment, Colonel Edward Lacey's Chester regiment, Colonel William Hill's York regiment and Major William Richardson Davie of the Waxhaws of Lancaster county with Col. Robert Irwin's cavalry of Mecklenburg county, North Carolina.

On August 1, 1780, Sumter launched an attack on the British outpost at Rocky Mount, west of Hanging Rock on the Catawba River. As part of this attack Sumter detached Major Davie on a diversionary attack on Hanging Rock. Davie attacked a fortified house, and captured 60 horses and a number of weapons, while also inflicting casualties on the British. This, however, did not prevent the British from sending troops from Hanging Rock to reinforce the garrison there. After his assault on Rocky Mount failed, Sumter decided to make an attack on the weakened Hanging Rock outpost.

Battle 
Sumter decided on a plan of attack of assaulting the camp in three mounted detachments. Early in the morning, the initial assault was made where Winn's and Davie's men completely routed Bryan's corps. Capt. After presenting a volley, McCulloch's company of the British Legion was also routed by Sumter's riflemen. The Prince of Wales Regt. also came under heavy fire and suffered very severe losses. Part of the Prince of Wales Regt then came up and having cleverly deployed themselves in some woods, checked the rebel assault with a surprise crossfire. This allowed the British to draw up in a hollow square in the center of the cleared ground and further protect themselves with a three-pound cannon left by some of Rugeley's Camden militia.

In the heat of the battle, Major Carden lost his nerve and surrendered his command to one of his junior officers. This was a major turning point for the Americans. At one point, Capt. Rousselet of the Legion infantry led a charge and forced many Sumter's men back. Lack of ammunition made it impossible for Sumter to completely knock out the British. The battle raged for 3 hours without pause, causing many men to faint from the heat and thirst.

Aftermath 

At the end, the British had lost 192 soldiers; the Americans lost 12 killed and 41 wounded. A group of Americans came across a storage of rum in the British camp and became so drunk they could not be brought back into the battle; thus, the intoxicated Americans left the field of battle and marched back to the base camp at Waxhaw.

The battle site has been listed on the National Register of Historic Places. It is managed by the South Carolina Department of Natural Resources. The American Battlefield Trust and its partners have acquired and preserved  of the battlefield.

See also
 American Revolutionary War § War in the South. Places ' Battle of Hanging Rock ' in overall sequence and strategic context.

Notes

References

 Savas and Dameron, A Guide to the Battles of the American Revolutionary War. Casemate Publishers, 2010. 

Conflicts in 1780
Battles involving the United States
Battles involving Great Britain
Hanging Rock
Lancaster County, South Carolina
Hanging Rock
1780 in South Carolina